The McCrory Waterworks is a historic site located in McCrory, Arkansas. It contains an elevated steel water tower, built in 1936 by the Chicago Bridge & Iron Company in conjunction with the Public Works Administration, which provided $39,497 in aid for the construction of the waterworks, which included the water tower, tank, and water shed. The site was added to the National Register of Historic Places in 2007, as part of a multiple-property listing that included numerous other New Deal-era projects throughout Arkansas.

See also
Cotter Water Tower
Cotton Plant Water Tower
Hampton Waterworks
Hartford Water Tower
De Valls Bluff Waterworks
National Register of Historic Places listings in Woodruff County, Arkansas

References

External links
An Ambition to be Preferred: New Deal Recovery Efforts and Architecture in Arkansas, 1933-1943, By Holly Hope

Industrial buildings and structures on the National Register of Historic Places in Arkansas
Infrastructure completed in 1935
Water supply infrastructure on the National Register of Historic Places
National Register of Historic Places in Woodruff County, Arkansas
Water towers on the National Register of Historic Places in Arkansas
Public Works Administration in Arkansas
1935 establishments in Arkansas